Pandappa Rajeev is an Indian BJP politician member of the Karnataka Legislative Assembly.

P. Rajeev was appointed sub-inspector in 2008 at Kudachi police station framed rescue team to flood affected area in Raibag taluka. He made sure that flood affected people reached a safe place. He got elected as Legislative member. 

In 2016, in an interview with India Today he claimed to be an independent MLA.

He contested the 2013 Karnataka Legislative Assembly elections as a Badavara Shramikara Raitara Congress candidate from Kudachi assembly constituency and won polling 71,057 votes.

In the 2018 Karnataka Legislative Assembly elections he contested as a BJP candidate and won by a margin of 15,008 votes.

References

External links 
P. Rajeev affidavit

Bharatiya Janata Party politicians from Karnataka
Living people
Karnataka MLAs 2013–2018
Karnataka MLAs 2018–2023
BSR Congress politicians
1977 births